Fear is the fifth studio album released by Danish progressive metal band Royal Hunt, It is the debut studio album from John West on vocals.

Track listing

All songs written by André Andersen.
 "Fear" – 9:38
 "Faces of War" – 6:56
 "Cold City Lights" – 5:23
 "Lies" – 7:44
 "Follow Me" – 6:22
 "Voices" – 5:20
 "Sea of Time" – 7:44

Personnel

André Andersen – keyboards and rhythm guitar 
John West – vocals
  Steen Mogensen – bass guitar
  Jacob Kjaer – lead guitar
Allan Sørensen – drums
Choirs
Kenny Lubcke – backing vocals
Henrik Brockmann – backing vocals

Production
Mixing – Lars Overgaard and Royal Hunt

References

External links
Heavy Harmonies page

Royal Hunt albums
1999 albums
SPV/Steamhammer albums
Magna Carta Records albums